Sadek Jordan Chebel Faucher (born 6 November 1991) is a French professional footballer of Algerian descent who plays as a forward.

Club career

Metz
On 1 May 2010, Faucher won the 2009–10 Coupe Gambardella with the Metz under-19 team, scoring a goal in the final against Sochaux. He also scored goals in the two previous rounds against Sedan and Lyon.

Tours
On 9 June 2010, Faucher left FC Metz to sign a contract with Tours.

On 17 December 2010, Faucher made his professional debut for Tours in a Ligue 2 match against Nîmes Olympique coming on a substitute in the 73rd minute. Four days later, he scored his first goal for the club in a game against Angers.

Maccabi Herzliya
From 2014 until 2017 Faucher played for Maccabi Herzliya.

Red Star
In August 2018, Faucher joined Red Star, newly promoted to Ligue 2, on a two-year contract.

Xanthi
On 11 July 2019, Xanthi officially announced the acquisition of the French striker on a free transfer. On 29 September 2019, he scored his first goal for the club in a 3–1 home win against Volos. On 5 October 2019, he scored in the dying minutes of an away match against Panathinaikos, to give his team a 1–0 win, which was the fifth in the first six matches.

On 5 January 2020, Faucher scored a brace within two minutes, to give his team a 2–1 home win against AEL. On 14 January 2020, his goal against Aris was not enough for his team to qualify for the quarter finals of the Greek Cup, as Xanthi lost 3–1 on aggregate. On 26 January 2020, he scored a brace, one of those in the second minute of second-half stoppage time to give Xanthi a point in a 2–2 home draw against OFI.

Virton
On 31 January 2022, Faucher was loaned to Virton.

International career
Despite being born in France, Algerian newspaper El Watan indicated that Faucher wanted to play for Algeria in international competition, following in the footsteps of his uncle Fathi Chebal.

Personal life
Faucher is the nephew of former Algerian international Fathi Chebal who played at the 1986 FIFA World Cup.

Honours

Club
Metz
 Coupe Gambardella: 2009–10

Individual
 Liga Leumit top goalscorer: 2015–16 (21 goals), 2016–17 (24 goals)

References

External links
 
 

1991 births
Living people
Sportspeople from Créteil
Association football forwards
Algerian footballers
French footballers
Ligue 2 players
Liga Leumit players
Israeli Premier League players
Belgian Pro League players
Challenger Pro League players
Super League Greece players
FC Metz players
Tours FC players
Royal Antwerp F.C. players
Maccabi Herzliya F.C. players
Hapoel Ra'anana A.F.C. players
Bnei Sakhnin F.C. players
Red Star F.C. players
Xanthi F.C. players
S.K. Beveren players
R.E. Virton players
Hapoel Acre F.C. players
Expatriate footballers in Belgium
French expatriate sportspeople in Belgium
Algerian expatriates in Belgium
Expatriate footballers in Greece
Expatriate footballers in Israel
French expatriate sportspeople in Israel
French sportspeople of Algerian descent
Footballers from Val-de-Marne